In Re Davis (1947) 75 CLR 409; [1947] HCA 53 is a High Court of Australia case regarding the admission of legal practitioners and the jurisdiction of courts over barristers.

Facts

Samuel Wilton Davis was admitted to the New South Wales Bar in 1946 following completion of all the necessary requirements under section 10 of the Legal Practitioners Act 1898-1936 (NSW).

He was disbarred by the Supreme Court of New South Wales in 1947 for failure to disclose that in 1935 he had pleaded guilty to a charge of breaking, entering and stealing.

Decision

The High Court upheld the decision of the Supreme Court to disbar Davis.

High Court of Australia cases
1947 in Australian law
1947 in case law